Rajee En Kanmani is a 1954 Indian Tamil-language romantic drama film directed by K. J. Mahadevan and produced by S. S. Vasan. The film stars T. R. Ramachandran and Sriranjani Jr. A remake of Charlie Chaplin's City Lights (1931), it was remade in Telugu with the title Rajee Naa Pranam in the same year.

Plot 
Ramu is a homeless orphan. He saves a flower-seller girl, Rajee from a car accident. Rajee is blind. Ramu takes pity on her and helps her in selling flowers. Love develops between them. Ramu happens to know an eye specialist. He takes Rajee to him for consultation. The doctor says her eye sight could be restored but it will cost 1000 rupees. Ramu wants to earn the money by some way. He accepts a challenge by a boxing stalwart and wins the prize money. But two crooks rob the money from Ramu. Then Ramu helps a drunken rich businessman. The rich man gives the money to Ramu as a present. Ramu pays the doctor. Ramu is arrested by the police on a false charge of theft and sent to prison.

In the meantime, the doctor performs the surgery and Rajee regains eye sight. She is longing to see Ramu but there is no news about him. Ramu tries to escape from the prison and gets caught. His sentence is extended. Rajee's aunt, who was her only support, dies. The house owner tries to advance on the helpless Rajee. She decides to end her life by drowning in the sea. At the nick of time, she is saved by a woman who is none other than the doctor's mother. She takes Rajee to home. Rajee starts working as a nurse with the doctor.

The doctor starts falling in love with Rajee but finds her mind is set with Ramu. There is another woman, Roopa, who has a one-sided love with the doctor. She finds the doctor is interested in Rajee and precipitates matters. The doctor opens his heart to Rajee. Now Rajee is torn between love and gratitude. She decides to leave the doctor's place. But the mother intercepts and pleads with Rajee to marry her son in order to save his life and happiness. Rajee marries the doctor and bears a son. She names the child as Ramu.

One day Ramu is released and he comes to the doctor's place to find out whether Rajee got her eyesight back. He now looks like a beggar. When he comes to the doctor's house, Rajee is at the threshold looking at Ramu. But she does not know he is Ramu. Ramu discovers her present position. The events of the day make him realise that her love for him has not diminished over the years. Rajee presents him a flower. He accepts it and fades out of her life with joy without identifying himself to her.

Cast 
Cast according to the opening credits of the film and songbook

 T. R. Ramachandran as Ramu
 Sriranjani as Raji
 Sriram as Doctor Ragunath
 S. V. Ranga Rao as Rich Man
 T. P. Muthulakshmi as Sundari
 Chandra Babu as Boxing Fan
 P. Vasundhara as Roopa
 S. Venkat as Referee
 T. S. Velayutham as Kannaiah
 T. N. Meenakshi as Doctor's mother
 G. V. Sharma as Worker
 K. R. Chellam as Raji's aunt
 K. S. Hariharan as Municipal Chairman

 V. K. Achari as Chandamarudha Singam
 Jagadeesan as Boxing Fan
 P. Susheela as Sheela
 Ganapathi Bhat as Policeman
 S. R. Lakshmi as Kumari Mohana
 T. S. B. Rao as Dharvan
 T. E. Krishnamachari as Magistrate
 V. P. S. Mani as Inspector
 V. T. Kalyanam as Kailasam
 P. K. Krishnan as Boxer
 T. N. Govindarajan as Policeman
 Master Krishnamoorthi as Baby Ramu
 Vimala as Housemaid

Dance
 Roy Chowdhury, Balaraman, Jayaraman, Kantha, Rajeswari, Chellam, Chandra, Jamuna, Chokkamma, Saroja, Sakunthala
 Gemini Boys and Girls

Production 
The film was produced by S. S. Vasan, owner of Gemini Studios, and directed by K. J. Mahadevan. He made Rajee En Kanmani an adaptation of the 1931 Charlie Chaplin film City Lights. Mahadevan stuck to the original storyline of City Lights for the most part and included the "dream ballet" executed by Chaplin in his film. However, Vasan felt it was too "highbrow" and did not include it in the final cut of the film.

Soundtrack 
Music was composed by S. Hanumantha Rao and the lyrics were penned by Sangu Subramaniam. The song "Malligai Poo Jaadhi Roja" sung by R. Balasaraswathi Devi became a hit, and is based on "La Violetera", a Spanish copla song composed by José Padilla.

 Telugu version

Reception 
The film was praised for its story and the performances of Ranga Rao, Ramachandran and Sriranjani, but became a box office failure.

References

External links 
 

1950s Tamil-language films
1954 films
1954 romantic drama films
Films about blind people in India
Gemini Studios films
Indian black-and-white films
Films scored by S. Hanumantha Rao
Indian remakes of American films
Indian romantic drama films
Tamil films remade in other languages